Peter Notaro (born July 5, 1956 in Baltimore, Maryland) is a retired American soccer forward who played in the North American Soccer League and Major Indoor Soccer League.

Notaro graduated from Calvert Hall College High School, then attended Loyola University Maryland where he played soccer from 1975 to 1978.  He holds the school's career goals record with 81 and was a 1977 Honorable Mention (third team) and 1978 First Team All American soccer player.  In 1979, he signed with the Chicago Sting of the North American Soccer League.  In the fall of 1979, he moved to the Cleveland Force of the Major Indoor Soccer League.  He was inducted into the Maryland Soccer Hall of Fame in 1998.

References

External links
 NASL/MISL stats

1957 births
Living people
Soccer players from Baltimore
American soccer players
Chicago Sting (NASL) players
Loyola Greyhounds men's soccer players
North American Soccer League (1968–1984) players
Major Indoor Soccer League (1978–1992) players
Cleveland Force (original MISL) players
All-American men's college soccer players
Association football forwards